Garithaianik was a district of Siunik in the old Armenia, ruled by a local family whose main ruler was Nerseh Garithaiani c. 850

See also
List of regions of old Armenia

Early medieval Armenian regions